Metapelma compressipes is a hymenoptera insect of the Eupelmidae family. The scientific name was first published in 1909 by Cameron.

References

 

Eupelmidae